Dalila Paola Méndez (born 1975), is an American visual artist of Guatemalan/Nicaraguan/Salvadoran descent.

Méndez's work incorporates painting, photography, and film. It explores themes of femininity, Latinidad, indigeneity, African diaspora, and queerness..

Background and early life 
Dalila Paola Méndez was born in Los Angeles, growing up in the Echo Park and Silver Lake neighborhoods. As a child, she spent many hours in Los Angeles’ public libraries where she was introduced to different art forms. Méndez credits taking art classes at East Hollywood's Barnsdall Art Park for igniting her love for the arts. Her first medium was photography, using her 35mm camera to explore color and subjects.

Méndez earned her BA in International Relations from the University of Southern California. She worked as a bilingual teacher for the Los Angeles Unified School District, teaching English to children in immigrant communities.  After leaving her teaching job, Méndez co-founded the Chicanx art collective Womyn Image Makers (WIM) with Aurora Guerrero and other Chicanx visual artists in 1999.

Works

Paintings 
 The Goddess Within (2009). Acrylic on lava rock canvas of a ceiba tree in the shape of a female body. Four female figures, a jaguar and a quetzal surround the ceiba tree presenting offerings.
LA Re-Imagined (2010). Acrylic on canvas painting of Los Angeles' landscape.  According to Micaela Jamaica Díaz-Sánchez, it blends the city's urban environment with the Salvadoran artisan rural aesthetics.
We the Resilient (2020). Mixed media on canvas. A collage celebrating the lives of Breonna Taylor, George Floyd, Andres Guardado and other victims of criminal violence by police.

Film 
Dalila Méndez has worked on several films as both production designer and art director. Since the early 2000s, Méndez has collaborated with fellow Womyn Image Makers (WIM) filmmakers, like Aurora Guerrero, on several projects.
 Pura Lengua (2005). Set in Los Angeles, the film tells the story of a queer Latina poet's experience navigating violence in her community.
 Viernes Girl (2005). The film explores a week in the life of two Salvadoran siblings.
Mosquita y Mari (2012). Set in Hunting Park, the film  explores identity, gender, and sexuality through the relationship of two young Chicanx girls.

Further reading 
Lucas, Laurie, Riverside Art Museum features Chicano Artist and Printmakers, The Press-Enterprise, (8/30/16), http://www.pe.com/articles/art-812008-chicano-self.htm
Solis, Nathan. The Chicana/o Printmakers of ‘Estampas de la Raza,’ KCET ARTBOUND, (9/7/15) https://www.kcet.org/shows/artbound/the-chicanao-printmakers-of-estampas-de-la-raza

References

External links 

Healing Through Cultural Knowledge
LA Commons Artist Spotlight: Dalila Méndez

Wikipedia Student Program
1975 births
Living people
21st-century American women artists
American women painters
Artists from Los Angeles
University of Southern California alumni